This article contains a list of steam boiler explosions such as  railway locomotive, marine transport (military and civilian), and stationary power.

Events

-SS Helen McGregor, Boiler Explosion, Memphis, TN, February 1830.

-Staten Island Ferry, Westfield II, FT boiler explosion: July 30, 1871.

-Givaudan Corporation, Delawanna Avenue, Clifton, New Jersey: Portable Fire Tube Boiler Explosion (1990s)

-Ford's River Rouge Plant, Dearborn, Michigan, Gas Boiler explosion, 6 killed 2/1/1999.

-St Mary's Hospital, Pennington Avenue, Passaic, New Jersey: Cleaver Brooks boiler Explosion 7/15/2006.

-Dana Corporation, Paris Tennessee, 400 Hp fire-tube boiler explosion 6/19/2007

Key safety developments

-1840 Henry R. Worthington invented boiler feed pump..

-1887 Robert Henry Thurston's book Steam Boiler Explosions in Theory, and in Practice is published

References

Further reading

Contemporary listings and accounts

 
 
 Manchester Steam Users' Association for the Prevention of Steam Boiler Explosions (Founded 1855)
 
 
 
 Marten E.B. Records of Steam Boiler Explosions Various volumes, e.g. 1869  at Open Library; 1872 at Open Library;  1875, 1878, 1890 covering explosions in Britain.
 The National Boiler Insurance Company

Other

 For a short status of European steam users' associations and boiler insurance companies c. 1897, see 

Steam power